The MTV Europe Music Award for Biggest Fans has been awarded since 2011.

Winners and nominees
Winners are listed first and highlighted in bold.

2010s

2020s

References

MTV Europe Music Awards
Awards established in 2011